Oberea annulicornis is a species of flat-faced longhorn beetle in the tribe Saperdini in the genus Oberea, discovered by Francis Polkinghorne Pascoe in 1858.

References

A
Beetles described in 1858